Çamlıpınar can refer to:

 Çamlıpınar, Anamur
 Çamlıpınar, Cumayeri
 Çamlıpınar, Laçin